Danilia otaviana is an extinct species of sea snail, a marine gastropod mollusk in the family Chilodontidae.

This species was described by Cantraine after a fossil shell he had found in Messina, Italy.

Description
The size of the shell varies between 7 mm and 15 mm. The shell has a globular shape. Its sculpture is fine and tight.

Distribution
This fossil species is found in the Mediterranean Sea; in the Atlantic Ocean off Northern Spain, Madeira and the Cape Verdes.

References

 Gofas, S.; Le Renard, J.; Bouchet, P. (2001). Mollusca, in: Costello, M.J. et al. (Ed.) (2001). European register of marine species: a check-list of the marine species in Europe and a bibliography of guides to their identification. Collection Patrimoines Naturels, 50: pp. 180–213

External links
 

otaviana)
Gastropods described in 1835
Molluscs of the Atlantic Ocean
Molluscs of the Mediterranean Sea
Molluscs of Madeira
Gastropods of Cape Verde